Sultan Abdul Kadir Alauddin Shah ibni Almarhum Sultan Zainal Abidin Shah (died 1590) is the tenth Sultan of Pahang who reigned from 1560 to 1590. Known as Raja Kadir before his accession, he is the youngest son of  the seventh Sultan of Pahang, Zainal Abidin Shah by his second wife, Tun Kamala, daughter of the Bendahara Sri Buwana. Abdul Kadir Alauddin Shah was adopted by his half-brother Mansur Shah II, and succeeded on his death as joint ruler in 1560. He was succeeded by his only son by royal wife, Raja Ahmad.

References

Bibliography

1590 deaths
16th-century Sultans of Pahang
16th-century murdered monarchs
Murder in 1590